The Chalk Hills are a  north–south-running low 'mountain' range in the San Fernando Valley perpendicular to and adjoining the Santa Monica Mountains. They are located in the  Woodland Hills District of the City of Los Angeles in Southern California. They run between DeSoto and Winnetka Avenues, from south of Ventura Boulevard north to near Victory Boulevard.

Geography
The Chalk Hills host an expansive, low-density, semi-urban suburb of the San Fernando Valley.

Los Angeles Pierce College is located on the northern portion of the Chalk Hills. Historically the free-flowing Los Angeles River ran around that portion. U.S. Route 101, the Ventura Freeway, cuts deeply through the southern part since the 1960s.

The range has a white soil and bedrock, resembling chalk, and was a 'white landform' Valley landmark before suburban development on it in the 1960s. The white rocks are marine shales. Geologists are unsure of its relationship with other rock formations in Southern California, although Thomas Dibblee has identified it as a member of the Sisquoc Formation. A small remnant California oak woodland plant community remains in an undeveloped southeastern area of the Pierce campus.

Local ranges
 Santa Monica Mountains — adjacent on south
 Simi Hills — to west
 Santa Susana Mountains — to north, across valley
 San Gabriel Mountains — to northeast, across valley
 Verdugo Mountains — to east, across valley

See also
 Index: Mountain ranges of Los Angeles County

References 

Hills of California
Transverse Ranges
Mountain ranges of Los Angeles County, California
Geography of the San Fernando Valley
Los Angeles Pierce College
Santa Monica Mountains
Woodland Hills, Los Angeles
Mountain ranges of Southern California